The 2nd Kisei was the 2nd edition of the Kisei tournament. Since Fujisawa Hideyuki won the previous year, he was given an automatic place in the final. Eight players battled in a knockout tournament to decide the final 2. Those two would then play each other in a best-of-3 match to decide who would face Fujisawa. Kato Masao became the challenger after beating Rin Kaiho 2 games to 1, but would lose 4 games to 3 against Fujisawa.

Main tournament

Challenger finals

Finals

References  

Kisei (Go)
1978 in go